Axis Point was an English rock band. The band signed to RCA and released two albums in a twelve-month period, with a line-up including an eclectic mix of well known musicians of that time. They disbanded in 1980, after releasing their second album.

History 
The original line-up of Axis Point included, guitarist John "Charlie" Whitney,  keyboardist Eddie Hardin, bassist Charlie McCracken and drummer Les Binks. They recorded Axis Point (1979). The songwriting on the album is split between Hardin and Whitney with McCraken co-writing "Woman of the world" and "Fire it up". After the recording of this album, Binks left and was replaced by Rob Townsend, who had been the drummer for Family. They recorded their second album Boast of the Town (1980). On this album Whitney and McCracken collaborate on most of the songs and added guitarist and vocalist Bobby Tench, who had previously been a member of Streetwalkers.

Band members 
Axis Point #1 
Charlie Whitney (guitar) 
Charlie McCracken (bass) 
Eddie Hardin (keyboards, vocals)
Les Binks (drums)

Axis Point #2
Charlie Whitney (guitar)
Charlie McCracken (bass)
Eddie Hardin (keyboards, vocals)
Rob Townsend (drums)

Additional musicians 
Bobby Tench (on Boast of the Town) - Guitar, vocals
 Colin Horton Jennings - backing vocals
 Ron Asprey - sax
 Tony Cox - String Arrangements

Discography 
Original releases
 Axis Point RCA 30039 (1978)
 Boast of the Town RCA 25277 (1980)

Re-issues 
Axis Point/Boast of the Town compilation
 BGO 576  (2002)
 BGO Records 576  (2003)

References

External links

English rock music groups
Musical groups established in 1974
RCA Records artists